The Azalea Regional Library System (AZRLS) is a collection of ten public libraries located partially in the Atlanta metropolitan area and Central Georgia. It is headquartered in Madison, Georgia and serves the counties of Greene, Hancock, Jasper, Morgan, Putnam, and Walton, of which 32% of the population are members of the library.

Until 2020, the Azalea Regional Library System was named the Uncle Remus Regional Library System for Uncle Remus, a fictional title character and narrator of many African-American folktales, whose stories were compiled by post-Reconstruction Atlanta journalist Joel Chandler Harris in the late 1880s. The logo for the library system was Br'er Rabbit, who is one of the central figures of Uncle Remus' stories. On January 9, 2020, Regional Board of Trustees for the Uncle Remus Regional Library System voted to change the Regional System’s name to the Azalea Regional Library System.

Azalea Regional Library System is part of PINES, a statewide public information network which allows for card holders to check out books from any of the 284 associated libraries in Georgia's 143 counties. It is also a part of Georgia Library Learning Online (GALILEO) which offers databases for research to those with an active subscription. Any member of the system has access to this database of information.

Branches

Library systems in neighboring counties
Gwinnett County Public Library to the north west
Athens Regional Library System to the north
Greater Clarks Hill Regional Library System to the east
Oconee Regional Library System to the south east
Middle Georgia Regional Library System to the south
Conyers-Rockdale Library System to the south west
Newton County Library System to the west

References

External links
PINES Catalog

County library systems in Georgia (U.S. state)
Public libraries in Georgia (U.S. state)